Ilkhchi (also Romanized as Īlkhchī) is a city in Ilkhchi District of Osku County, East Azerbaijan province, Iran. At the 2006 census, its population was 13,927 in 4,014 households. The following census in 2011 counted 15,231 people in 4,735 households. The latest census in 2016 showed a population of 16,574 people in 5,500 households. Ilkhchi is located to the south east of Tabriz, the capital city of East Azerbaijan province.

References 

Osku County

Cities in East Azerbaijan Province

Populated places in East Azerbaijan Province

Populated places in Osku County